The 1999 Victorian state election was held on 18 September 1999.

Retiring Members

Labor
Neil Cole MLA (Melbourne)
David Cunningham MLA (Melton)
Demetri Dollis MLA (Richmond)
Eddie Micallef MLA (Springvale)
Jan Wilson MLA (Dandenong North)
Tayfun Eren MLC (Doutta Galla)
Caroline Hogg MLC (Melbourne North)
Jean McLean MLC (Melbourne West)
Pat Power MLC (Jika Jika)
Barry Pullen MLC (Melbourne)

Liberal
Geoff Coleman MLA (Bennettswood)
Phil Gude MLA (Hawthorn)
Paul Jenkins MLA (Ballarat West)
David Perrin MLA (Bulleen)
Jim Plowman MLA (Evelyn)
Tom Reynolds MLA (Gisborne)
Ian Smith MLA (Polwarth)
Alan Stockdale MLA (Brighton)
Marie Tehan MLA (Seymour)
Jan Wade MLA (Kew)
Dick de Fegely MLC (Ballarat)
Ron Wells MLC (Eumemmerring)
Rosemary Varty MLC (Silvan)

National
Bill McGrath MLA (Wimmera)
John McGrath MLA (Warrnambool)

Legislative Assembly
Sitting members are shown in bold text. Successful candidates are highlighted in the relevant colour. Where there is possible confusion, an asterisk (*) is also used.

Legislative Council
Sitting members are shown in bold text. Successful candidates are highlighted in the relevant colour. Where there is possible confusion, an asterisk (*) is also used.

References
Victorian Electoral Commission Official Results
Psephos - Adam Carr's Election Archive

Victoria
Candidates for Victorian state elections